Ashwant Gobinathan (born 8 September 1993) is an Australian badminton player. He won the men's singles title at the 2016 Oceania Championships, also the silver in 2014, and a bronze medal in 2015.

Achievements

Oceania Championships 
Men's singles

BWF International Challenge/Series 
Men's singles

  BWF International Challenge tournament

  BWF International Series tournament
  BWF Future Series tournament

References

External links 
 

Living people
1993 births
Australian people of Malaysian descent
Australian people of Tamil descent
Australian sportspeople of Indian descent
Australian male badminton players